Rafael Darwing Bautista Rodriguez (born March 8, 1993) is a Dominican professional baseball outfielder who is a free agent. He has played in Major League Baseball (MLB) for the Washington Nationals.

Professional career

Washington Nationals
Bautista signed with the Washington Nationals as an international free agent in January 2012. He began his professional career in 2012 with the rookie-league-level Dominican Summer League Nationals in the Dominican Summer League, where he batted .329 with 25 runs batted in (RBIS) and 47 stolen bases. In 2013 he played in the rookie-league-level Gulf Coast League for the Gulf Coast League Nationals, who that year finished their regular season with a record of 49–9, giving them the highest winning percentage (.845) for a full regular season ever achieved by a minor-league baseball team based in the United States. The team then won all three of its playoff games, defeating the Gulf Coast League Pirates in a single-game semifinal playoff and sweeping the Gulf Coast League Red Sox in the best-of-three league championship series, to become the 2013 Gulf Coast League champions. Bautista appeared in 52 games during the championship season, batting .322 with one home run, 27 RBIs, and 26 stolen bases.

Bautista spent 2014 with the Class A Hagerstown Suns in the South Atlantic League, hitting .290 with five home runs, 54 RBIs, and 69 stolen bases. He split 2015 between the Class A Advanced Potomac Nationals in the Carolina League, the Class A Short Season Auburn Doubledays in the New York-Penn League, and the Gulf Coast League Nationals, batting a combined .275 for the year with a home run, 14 RBIs, and 26 stolen bases, and over the 2015-2016 offseason played in the Dominican Winter League with Leones del Escogido. He advanced to the Class AA Harrisburg Senators in the Eastern League for the 2016 season, hitting .282 with four home runs, 39 RBIs, and 56 stolen bases, and after that season the Washington Nationals added him to their 40-man roster. He again played winter ball with Leones del Escogido during the 2016-2017 offseason.

Bautista began the 2017 season with the Class AAA Syracuse Chiefs in the International League. The Washington Nationals promoted him to the major leagues on April 29, 2017. He made his major league debut on April 30 in a 23–5 Nationals victory over the New York Mets at Nationals Park in Washington, D.C., batting twice and going 0-for-2 against Mets catcher Kevin Plawecki, who was making his first-ever major league appearance as a pitcher. On May 6, in a 6–2 Nationals victory over the Philadelphia Phillies at Citizens Bank Park in Philadelphia, he made his first career major-league start, playing right field, and got his first career major-league hit, a single through the infield off Phillies pitcher Vince Velasquez. The Nationals optioned Bautista back to Syracuse on May 8.

The Nationals recalled Bautista on August 27, but optioned him back to Syracuse the next day. They called him back up again on September 7, and he finished the regular season with the Nationals. He completed the season having played in 17 major-league games, batting .160 with four hits – all singles – in 25 at-bats, scoring two runs, and with a slugging percentage of .160 and an on-base percentage of .222.

In the minor leagues, Bautista played 43 games for Syracuse and 13 for the Gulf Coast League Nationals during 2017. He hit a combined .259 for the two teams, with 14 RBIs and nine stolen bases.

Bautista participated in 2018 major-league spring training before the Nationals optioned him to the Class AAA Syracuse Chiefs on March 14. He was reassigned to the Class AA Harrisburg Senators on April 2 and began the season with them, but was promoted back to Syracuse on April 12. He had made 45 plate appearances for Syracuse, batting .429 with a .966 on-base-plus-slugging percentage (OPS) when, on April 24, the Nationals called him up to the major leagues. He appeared in nine games, usually as a late-game replacement or a pinch-runner, made one start, and went 0-for-6, striking out once and scoring a run before the Nationals optioned him back to Syracuse on May 7 to make room on their 25-man roster when they activated right-handed relief pitcher Shawn Kelley from the 10-day disabled list. Bautista made another 46 plate appearances for Syracuse, batting .300 with a .749 OPS, before colliding with another player during a game against the Rochester Red Wings at Rochester, New York, on May 17, tearing the anterior cruciate ligament, lateral collateral ligament, and meniscus in his left knee. The injury required season-ending surgery. He ended his season with an overall .303 batting average in the minor leagues, with three doubles, a triple, a home run, seven RBIs, and six stolen bases in the minors for the year. On June 9, the Nationals released Bautista to make room for Adam Eaton on their roster when they activated Eaton from the 60-day disabled list. On June 13, Washington re-signed Bautista to a minor league deal. He spent the remainder of the season in Triple-A Syracuse.

In 2019, Bautista played for Double-A Harrisburg, Single-A Hagerstown, and Low-A Auburn, slashing .182/.256/.255 with 2 home runs and 9 RBI across 29 games between the three teams. Bautista did not play in a game in 2020 due to the cancellation of the minor league season because of the COVID-19 pandemic. On November 2, 2020, he elected free agency. On November 12, 2020, Bautista re-signed with the Nationals on a minor league contract. Bautista was assigned to the Triple-A Rochester Red Wings to begin the 2021 season. He elected free agency on November 7, 2021.

References

External links

1993 births
Living people
Auburn Doubledays players
Dominican Republic expatriate baseball players in the United States
Dominican Summer League Nationals players
Gigantes del Cibao players
Gulf Coast Nationals players
Hagerstown Suns players
Harrisburg Senators players
Leones del Escogido players
Major League Baseball outfielders
Major League Baseball players from the Dominican Republic
Potomac Nationals players
Rochester Red Wings players
Sportspeople from Santo Domingo
Syracuse Chiefs players
Washington Nationals players